Wäiski is a restaurant ship located in Merihaka, Helsinki, Finland.

History
The ship has had a long history. The steam ship Wäiski was originally built in 1911 in Germany as the passenger ship Oldenburg. It was later resold and renamed many times. In 1967, it was sold to Oskarshamn, Sweden.

In 1989, it was sold to Naantali, Finland, and in 1999, it finally settled in Merihaka.

References

External links

 

Restaurants in Helsinki
Ships of Finland
Ships built in Germany
Floating restaurants
1911 ships